SDIO may refer to:
 Secure Digital Input Output, a type of Secure Digital card interface. It can be used as an interface for input or output devices. 
 Strategic Defense Initiative Organization, an organization set up to oversee the Strategic Defense Initiative; now known as the Missile Defense Agency.